The Murugan Temple of North America is the first temple in the United States that is dedicated to the Hindu deity Murugan. In addition, the temple conducts bhajans, Tamil and religious classes. Devotees from Maryland, Washington, Virginia and throughout the country (even from neighboring Canada) visit this traditional Saivite Hindu temple. The main sannidhi at the temple is for Murugan with Valli and Devasena. There are four other sannidhis, for Vinayaka (Ganesha), Siva, Meenakshi, Durga and Palani Aandavar.

Major festivals
The following major festivals are celebrated:
 Thaipusam
 Panguni Uthiram
 Vaikasi Visagam
 Aadi krithigai
 Nallur Kathirgamam Kanthan Festival  (Lord Murugan ascends in the Ratham)
 Kanda Shasti Kavasam
 Thiruvathirai function for Lord Nataraja  (Arudra Darisanam)
 Maha Shivaratri
 Navaratri (10 days)
 Vinayagar Chathurthi
 Karthikai Deepam
 Six Annual Abishegams for Lord Nataraja (Thiruvonam Nakshatram in the month of Chithirai, Uttiram Nakshatram in the month of Aani, Thiruvathirai Nakshatram in the month of Marghazi, Purva Paksha Chaturdasi evening in the months of Aavani, Purattasi and Maasi)

The grand procession of Lord Murugan with Valli Devasena takes place during major festivals. On 7 August 2009, the Vellottam was conducted for the new Ratham. On 8 August 2009, Lord Murugan ascended in the new Ratham for the Nallur Kathirgamam Kanthan festival. It was drawn by the devotees around the Murugan Temple during an auspicious period. Every year, the Nallur festival is celebrated in Murugan Temple during August and Murugan ascends in the Ratham. The second Kumbabhishegam for all deities in the Murugan Temple was performed on 13 May 2011.

References

External links

 Murugan Temple of North America official website

Asian-American culture in Maryland
Hindu temples in Maryland
Lanham, Maryland
Religious buildings and structures in Prince George's County, Maryland
Religious buildings and structures completed in 1999
Tamil-American culture
1999 establishments in Maryland
Indian-American culture in Maryland